Ángel Paredes Hortelano (La Línea de la Concepción, 12 January 1965) better known as Ángel Garó is a Spanish actor and comedian. He lives in Málaga.

He became very popular in the 1990s thanks to his performances in Un, dos, tres... responda otra vez and his show Personas humanas. He dubbed all the characters of the movie FernGully: The Last Rainforest in Spain, and he has taken part in different programs like Noche de Fiesta or Mira quien baila.

External links

1965 births
Living people
People from La Línea de la Concepción
Spanish male voice actors
Spanish comedians
Spanish male television actors
Spanish stand-up comedians